The 4 June Rolling Stock Works (6.4 Ch'aryang Chonghap Kiŏpso) is a manufacturer of railway rolling stock in Wŏnsan, North Korea. It is a subordinate division of the DPRK Ministry of Railways. It is capable of producing 3,000 new freight cars per year, as well as repairing 200 steam locomotives and 130 buses.

The plant was originally built in the colonial era, specialising in the production of parts for rolling stock and undertaking minor locomotive repairs. It was destroyed during the Korean War and was repaired and expanded with Polish assistance after the Korean Armistice Agreement, becoming operational, producing 30-ton freight cars, on 15 June 1957. The first trial of an all-steel gondola of 60 tons capacity took place in 1959, with mass production of the design commencing in 1966. Production of the Type 551 boxcar began on 10 May 1963, and in 1982, a new four-bogie gondola of 100 tons capacity (Mu12 class, Korean State Railway 48000-series) and cleared for 90 km/h service, was introduced, entering production in 1987. A covered hopper of 60 ton capacity (Se3, KSR 18000-series) has been produced since 1991.

See also
 Kim Chong-t'ae Electric Locomotive Works

References

Vehicle manufacturing companies established in 1957
Manufacturing companies of North Korea
Rolling stock manufacturers of North Korea
1957 establishments in North Korea